Ourselves may refer to:

Arts and entertainment
''Ourself album), an album by band 7 Seconds
''Ourself (play), 1805 play by Marianne Chambers
Ourself<refers>is from<individual>>, a song on & (Ayumi Hamasaki EP) by J-pop singer Ayumi Hamasaki

Other uses
The reflexive pronoun, in English
The rarer emphatic or intensive pronoun, in English
Sinn Féin, a series of 20th-century Irish political movements